The Hohenstaufen-Gymnasium is a bilingual grammar school in Göppingen, Germany.

Campus 
The two main buildings of the Hohenstaufen-Gymnasium were designed by architect Guenter Behnisch and are now under monumental protection (Denkmalschutz).

The main buildings are connected via two glazed bridges.

The north building houses the administrative offices (offices of the headmistress, deputy headmistress, secretariat, teachers' offices and lounge, conference rooms), class rooms, library, art halls, art work station rooms, geography hall, music hall, student's lounge and Senior's lounge. Beyond this, the full-day care for students in years 5 and 6 takes place here, during afternoon classes.

The south or science building accommodates rooms and halls for theoretical and experimental education in chemistry, physics and biology. It also houses several preparation rooms and an extra class room.

The campus of the school also offers multi-usage sports field, gymnasium, dining hall and indoor pool.

The premises of the near Youth Centre (Haus der Jugend) may also be used on occasion.

School-leaving qualifications 
Dependent on elective classes and courses, students may attain the following qualifications after year 12:

Abitur Baden-Wuerttemberg
International Abitur Baden-Wuerttemberg
Bilingual Abitur Baden-Wuerttemberg

Beyond these university entrance qualifications, students may - according to state law -  attain lower qualifications in year 9 (Hauptschulabschluss), year 10 (mittlere Reife) and year 11 (Fachhochschulreife).

Clubs

Sports 
The school has teams for the 'Youth Training for the Olympics' contest (fencing, tennis, swimming, soccer etc.) and offers extra-curricular training in track and field athletics, swimming, gymnastics, soccer, table tennis and unicycling.

Music 
The Hohenstaufen-Gymnasium has its own Big Band, Orchestra, Youth Choir, Chamber Choir and String Players Club.

Social 
The grammar school has teams for the national debating, FIRST LEGO League, young scientists competitions.

It also has beekeeping, coding, paramedics, typing education, theater, school paper, lounging, meditation/worship and homework clubs.

Awards 
The school has been awarded the titles of:
Partner School for Europe (Partnerschule für Europa)
Fairtrade School
STEM-friendly School
Among The Most Valuable Preparation Centres (Cambridge University Assessment English)

Notable alumni 
Jochen Stutzky - Soccer commentator and TV host
Horst Kern - Professor and former Dean at the Leibniz University Hannover
Dieter Hundt - business man and former member of the board of VfB Stuttgart
Ulrich Klieber - artist and recipient of the Federal Museum of Germany Award
Hans-Jochen Kleineidam - Professor at the Federal Military University for economics
Karl Hinderer - Mathematician at the Universities of Hamburg, Karlsruhe and Dresden
Dr. Matthias Dannemann - Chief Executive Priest in Bad Waldsee

Hohenstaufen-Gymnasium Foundation 
The school foundation (officially: Verein der Förderer und Freunde des Hohenstaufen-Gymnasiums e.V.) is a separate private entity operating to assist the school board in funding projects.

Among other projects funded by the foundation are a sculpture by Fritz Nuss, the canteen and dining hall, computers, IT equipment for all class rooms and water fountains in the main building and dining hall.

References 

High schools in Germany
Buildings and structures in Göppingen (district)
Educational institutions established in 1831
1831 establishments in Germany